Oscar or Oskar Nilsson may refer to:

Oscar Nilsson (equestrian) (1896–1974), Swedish vaulter who competed in the 1920 Summer Olympics
Oskar Nilsson (equestrian) (1897–1958), Swedish vaulter who competed in the 1920 Summer Olympics 
Oskar Nilsson (drummer) (born 1988), Swedish drummer 
Oskar Nilsson (ice hockey) (born 1991), Swedish ice hockey defenceman
Nils Oskar Nilsson (1935–2018), Swedish politician